Nine Songs or 9 Songs may refer to:

Arts and entertainment

Film
 9 Songs, a 2004 British art romantic drama film written and directed by Michael Winterbottom

Literature
 Jiu Ge (Nine Songs), a set of Chinese poems written in the 3rd century BC

Music

Classical music
 Nine Songs, a composition with opus number 69 by Johannes Brahms
 Romances and Songs (Nine Songs), a composition with opus number 18 by Edvard Grieg
 Liederkreis, Op. 24 (sometimes titled with "9 songs for voice & piano"), a composition by Robert Schumann
 9 Songs, a composition with opus number 60 by Max Bruch

Contemporary music
 Nine Songs From the Garden of Welcome Lies, a 1997 album by composer Paul Schütze